The Second Gleam (sometimes written The Gleam II) is a 2008 EP by The Avett Brothers.   Produced by The Avett Brothers and Doug Williams, recorded by Doug Williams at Electromagnetic Radiation Recorders, with the exception of "The Greatest Sum (Electric)" which was recorded at Echo Mountain. This acoustic EP was a follow-up to The Gleam, which was released in 2006.

Track listing
"Tear Down the House" - 3:04
"Murder in the City" - 3:12
"Bella Donna" - 3:03
"The Greatest Sum" - 3:20
"Black, Blue" - 4:27 (only by download, vinyl, or streaming)
"St. Joseph's" - 3:23
"Souls Like the Wheels" - 4:38
"The Greatest Sum (Electric)" - 3:13 (only by download, vinyl, or streaming)

Charts

References

The Avett Brothers albums
2008 EPs